Shammi Thilakan is an Indian actor and dubbing artist who is active in Malayalam films. He is the son of veteran actor Thilakan. He lent his voice for Napoleon in Devasuram, Prem Nazir in Kadathanadan Ambadi and for Nassar in Ghazal, for which he won a state award for best dubbing artist. He has acted in villain, comic and character roles.

He did his primary education from NSS High School, Thadiyoor, Pathanamthitta. He started his career as a theater artist at the age of 15. He worked in different drama troupes like PJ Theaters, Rashmi Theaters, Chalakudy Saradhi, Kalashala Thrippunithura, and Kollam Tuna. Fazah for Chalakudy Saradhi was the first drama he directed. He directed more than 25 dramas.

Personal life
He is married to Usha and has a son, Abimanyu. He currently resides in Kollam with family.

Awards
 2018 - Kerala State Film Awards-Best Dubbing Artist: Odiyan
 2013 - TTK Prestige-Vanitha Film Awards - Best Comedian (Neram, Sringaravelan)
 1993 - Kerala State Film Awards-Best Dubbing Artist: - Gazal (1993 film)

Filmography

As an actor

As a dubbing artist

Television serials
 Kayamkulam Kochunni (Surya TV)
 Vikramadithyan (Asianet)
 Ente manasaputhri(Asianet)
 Vajram (Asianet)
 Kadamattathu Kathanar (Asianet)
 Crime & Punishment (Asianet)
 Saayvinte Makkal (Mazhavil Manorama)
 Mahathma Gandhi Colony (Surya TV)

References

External links

http://keralaboxoffice.com/shammi-thilakan-father
https://www.youtube.com/watch?v=hfvQj_Tgcac
Shammi Thilakan at MSI
Shammi Thilakan at Malayalasangeetham

Kerala State Film Award winners
Indian male film actors
Living people
Male actors from Pathanamthitta
Male actors in Malayalam cinema
Place of birth missing (living people)
People from Pathanamthitta
20th-century Indian male actors
21st-century Indian male actors
1971 births